Alfonso Antonio Leyva Yepez (born January 6, 1993) is a Mexican Greco-Roman wrestler and mixed martial artist.

Wrestling career
He competed in the men's Greco-Roman 85 kg event at the 2016 Summer Olympics, in which he was eliminated in the round of 32 by Robert Kobliashvili.

After claiming second place in 2019 Pan American Games, Leyva competed in the men's Greco-Roman 77 kg event at the 2020 Summer Olympics. In the round of 16, Leyva was eliminated from the tournament against Aleksandr Chekhirkin.

Mixed martial arts career
After retiring from wrestling after the 2020 Summer Olympics due to lack of support, he announced transition to mixed martial arts. Skipping the amateur career, he went professional and has racked a 5–0 record in the Mexican regional circuit.

Leyva made his stateside debut against Daniel Reis at LFA 135 on July 8, 2022. He won the fight via second-round technical knockout.

Mixed martial arts record

|-
| Loss
| align=center| 6–1
| Chris Brown 
| KO (body kick)
|LFA 148
| 
| align=center| 1
| align=center| 3:02
| Commerce, California, United States
| 
|-
| Win
| align=center| 6–0
| Daniel Reis
| TKO (elbows)
| LFA 135
| 
| align=center| 2
| align=center| 1:10
| Phoenix, Arizona, United States
| 
|-
| Win
| align=center| 5-0
| Alberto Galera
| TKO (punches)
| UWC Mexico 30
| 
| align=center| 2
| align=center| 4:19
| Tijuana, Mexico
| 
|-
| Win
| align=center| 4–0
| Hiram Furukawa
| TKO (punches)
| UWC Mexico 29
| 
| align=center| 2
| align=center| 1:54
| Tijuana, Mexico
| 
|-
| Win
| align=center| 3–0
| Fernando Oliva
| TKO (punches)
| UWC Mexico 25
| 
| align=center| 2
| align=center| 4:20
| Tijuana, Mexico
| 
|-
| Win
| align=center| 2–0
| Luis Guzman
| KO
| UWC Mexico 24
| 
| align=center| 1
| align=center| 1:48
| Tijuana, Mexico
| 
|-
| Win
| align=center| 1–0
| Yasser Guzman
| TKO (punches)
| UWC Mexico 23
| 
| align=center| 1
| align=center| 0:35
| Tijuana, Mexico
| 
|-

References

External links
 
 
 
 

1993 births
Living people
Mexican male sport wrestlers
Olympic wrestlers of Mexico
Wrestlers at the 2016 Summer Olympics
Wrestlers at the 2015 Pan American Games
Wrestlers at the 2019 Pan American Games
Pan American Games medalists in wrestling
Pan American Games silver medalists for Mexico
Medalists at the 2019 Pan American Games
Pan American Wrestling Championships medalists
Wrestlers at the 2020 Summer Olympics
Sportspeople from Guadalajara, Jalisco
Mexican male mixed martial artists
Mixed martial artists utilizing Greco-Roman wrestling
Mixed martial artists utilizing Brazilian jiu-jitsu
Mexican practitioners of Brazilian jiu-jitsu
21st-century Mexican people